The 1961 Tour de France was the 48th edition of the Tour de France, one of cycling's Grand Tours. Out of the 132 riders who started the tour, 72 managed to complete the tour's tough course. Throughout the 1961 Tour de France, two of the French national team's riders, André Darrigade and Jacques Anquetil held the yellow jersey for the entirety 21 stages. There was a great deal of excitement between the second and third places, concluding with Guido Carlesi stealing Charly Gaul's second-place position on the last day by two seconds.

Teams

The teams entering the race were:

 Italy
 France
 Belgium
 Spain
 Netherlands
 West Germany
 Switzerland/Luxembourg
 Great Britain
 Paris/North-East
 Centre-Midi
 West/South-West

Pre-race favourites

Since Jacques Anquetil had won the 1957 Tour de France, he was unable to repeat it, due to illness, tiredness and struggle within the French team. For 1961, he asked the team captain Marcel Bidot to make a team that would only ride for him, and Bidot agreed. Anquetil announced before the race that he would take the yellow jersey as leader of the general classification on the first day, and wear it until the end of the race in Paris.

Gastone Nencini, who won the previous edition, did not enter in 1961, but Graziano Battistini, his teammate and runner-up of 1960, started the race as leader of the Italian team. If the French team would again have internal struggles, the Italian team could emerge as the winner.

The Spanish team had two outsiders, José Pérez Francés and Fernando Manzaneque. The last outsider was Charly Gaul, winner of the 1958 Tour de France, who rode in the mixed Luxembourg/Swiss team. He considered his teammates so weak that he did not seek their help, and rode the race on his own. Raymond Poulidor was convinced by his team manager Antonin Magne that it would be better to skip the Tour, because the national team format would undermine his commercial value.

Route and stages

The 1961 Tour de France started on 25 June in Rouen, and had one rest day, in Montpellier. For the first time the finish on top of the Superbagnères was included to the race.

Race overview

André Darrigade won the opening stage, and it became the fifth time that he won the opening stage. Darrigade had been in a small group that broke away, which included Anquetil. Other competitors, such as Gaul and Battistini, already lost more than 5 minutes. After that, there was a time trial, won by Jacques Anquetil. Anquetil became the leader of the race, with his teammate Joseph Groussard in second place, almost five minutes behind him.

The second stage, run in bad weather, featured small roads in Northern France. Several cyclists got into problems, and seven cyclists already had to leave the race; the favourites were not harmed. In the sixth stage, West German Horst Oldenburg fell down on the descent of the Col de la Schlucht, and the Dutch team captain Ab Geldermans ran into him. Geldermans was taken to the Belfort hospital by helicopter, and the Dutch team had lost its captain.

Unlike previous years, the French team continued without fights, and won five of the first eight stages. The ninth stage included four major climbs. On the second climb, Gaul escaped. He crashed on the descent of the third mountain, but managed to stay away and win the stage; Anquetil was not far behind and kept the lead. Anquetil had a five-minutes margin on the second-placed rider, which was Manzaneque. In the eleventh stage, Graziano Battistini was hit by a car, and had to leave the race.
This situation had not changed when the sixteenth stage started. It was expected that Gaul, in third place more than six minutes behind, would attack, but this did not happen, because Gaul had been injured in his crash in the previous stage.

The last chance for the opposition to win back time on Anquetil was in the seventeenth stage, but Anquetil stayed close to his direct competitors, and only allowed lower classified riders to escape. The press criticized Anquetil's tactics, saying he was riding passively. In the nineteenth stage, an individual time trial, Gaul was on his way to win back a little time on Anquetil, when he crashed heavily, and could not find his pace again. Anquetil won almost three minutes on Gaul and extended his lead to more than ten minutes.

In the final two stages, Anquetil did not get into problems. His main rival Gaul even lost time in the last stage, and conceded his second place to Guido Carlesi.

Classification leadership and minor prizes

There were several classifications in the 1961 Tour de France, two of them awarding jerseys to their leaders. The most important was the general classification, calculated by adding each cyclist's finishing times on each stage. The cyclist with the least accumulated time was the race leader, identified by the yellow jersey; the winner of this classification is considered the winner of the Tour.

Additionally, there was a points classification. In the points classification, cyclists got points for finishing among the best in a stage finish. The cyclist with the most points lead the classification, and was identified with a green jersey.

There was also a mountains classification. Most stages of the race included one or more categorised climbs, in which points were awarded to the riders that reached the summit first. The climbs were categorised as third-, second- or first-category, with the more difficult climbs rated lower. The cyclist with the most points lead the classification, but was not identified with a jersey.

For the team classification The calculation was different from previous years. Before 1961, the classification was based on time, but in 1961, it was based on points; times of the best three cyclists per team on each stage were added; the team with the lowest time on a stage won the team prize for that stage. The overall team classification was calculated by counting the number of team prizes.

In addition, there was a combativity award, in which a jury composed of journalists gave points after each stage to the cyclist they considered most combative. The split stages each had a combined winner. At the conclusion of the Tour, the entire West/South-West team won the overall super-combativity award, also decided by journalists. The Souvenir Henri Desgrange was given in honour of Tour founder Henri Desgrange to the first rider to pass the summit of the Ballon d'Alsace on stage 6. This prize was won by Jef Planckaert.

Final standings

General classification

Points classification

Mountains classification

Team classification

Aftermath
As Anquetil had led the race after every stage, there was not much competitiveness, which organiser Jacques Goddet termed a "fiasco". After the race, the system with national teams was abandoned, and it was announced that the 1962 Tour de France would be run with sponsored teams.

Notes

References

Bibliography

External links

 
Tour
Tour de France by year
1961 in road cycling
Tour de France
Tour de France
1961 Super Prestige Pernod